, real name , is a Japanese painter based in Paris, France.

Aki Kuroda, well known for his silhouettes and figures painted with line strokes, which has been considered like a symbol of “passage” to the labyrinth.
Since 1992, he has continued to produce a fluxional interactive art spectacle/installation named "COSMOGARDEN" (the cosmic garden).

Books
COSMOGARDEN COSMOJUNGLE (ed.) Seigensha, Japan, 2007. website
KURODA, (ed.) Maeght, France, 2002.  website

External links
cosmogarden.com by Aki Kuroda

1944 births
Living people
Modern artists
Japanese painters
Contemporary painters
Japanese expatriates in France